The lesser jacana (Microparra capensis) is a species of bird in the family Jacanidae. It is monotypic within the genus Microparra.

It is found in Angola, Botswana, Burkina Faso, Burundi, Cameroon, Central African Republic, Chad, Democratic Republic of the Congo, Eswatini, Ivory Coast, Ethiopia, Kenya, Malawi, Mali, Mauritania, Mozambique, Namibia, Niger, Nigeria, Rwanda, Sierra Leone, South Africa, Sudan, Tanzania, Uganda, Zambia, and Zimbabwe. Its primary habitats are coastal and inland wetlands and waterways.

References

External links

 Lesser jacana - Species text in The Atlas of Southern African Birds

lesser jacana
Birds of Sub-Saharan Africa
Birds of Southern Africa
lesser jacana
Taxonomy articles created by Polbot
Taxa named by Andrew Smith (zoologist)